Hostomice is a market town in Teplice District in the Ústí nad Labem Region of the Czech Republic. It has about 1,300 inhabitants.

Notable people
Čestmír Císař (1920–2013), politician and diplomat

References

Populated places in Teplice District
Market towns in the Czech Republic